The Friese doorloper is a type of ice skate from the Netherlands.  means "Frisian" ("of Friesland"), and  "to walk" or "run through", reflecting the design. It consists of a shaped length of wood secured to a metal blade of the same length to form a single unit which can be bound to a boot or shoe. It was on based on earlier designs of wooden skate, and differs from them in that the blade extends several inches behind the heel instead of ending under it. This reduces the risk of the wearer falling over backwards, particularly when stopping. (With the older designs, the wearer braked by raising their toes and digging their heels into the ice; with the new one, by angling the blades.) It was first commercialised in 1875 by the skatemaking companies A. K. Hoekstra of Wergea and D. G. Minkema of Oosterlittens, both of Friesland, as a touring skate. By the early years of the 20th Century it had completely replaced the old designs. It was also used for speed skating ( - straight-line sprinting). After 1945, it was gradually replaced by skating boots, in which the metal blade is directly attached to the sole, and the last specialist manufacturer of Friese doorlopers closed in 1965. However,  models which use plastics instead of wood are commercially

References

Ice skates
Speed skating in the Netherlands